Eduard Šalé (born March 10, 2005) is a Czech professional ice hockey forward who currently plays for the HC Kometa Brno in the Czech Extraliga (ELH) and is considered the top Czech prospect in the 2023 NHL Entry Draft.

Playing career
Šalé played as a youth within hometown club, HC Kometa Brno, first appearing as a 13 year-old at the under-16 level. During the 2020–21 season, Šalé having appeared with the under-20 team, he briefly left Brno and made 7 appearances at the Finnish under-18 SM-sarja competition with Ilves. 

Returning to Kometa Brno, Šalé made his senior professional debut in the Czech Extraliga during the 2021–22 season, finishing with 2 goals and 3 points in 10 regular season games.

International play

Šalé first represented Czechia at the 2021 Hlinka Gretzky Cup and in the following year he was recognised as one of the top ranked stars in the 2022 Hlinka Gretzky Cup.

Šalé won a Silver medal with Czechia at the 2023 World Junior Ice Hockey Championships.

Career statistics

Regular season and playoffs

International

References

External links
 

2005 births
Living people
Czech ice hockey left wingers
Ice hockey people from Brno
Czech expatriate ice hockey players in Finland
HC Kometa Brno players